The Order of Bernardo O'Higgins is an award issued by Chile. It is the highest civilian honor awarded to non-Chilean citizens. This award was established in 1965 and named after one of the founders of the Chilean state, the independentist general Bernardo O'Higgins, who was a leader of the struggle from 1810 to 1826 for independence of Spanish colonies which became Chile and Peru.

Grades

The order is made up of the following grades:

 Knight
 Officer
 Commander
 Grand Officer
 Grand Cross
 Collar

Recipients
 Emilio Álvarez Montalván
 Margot Benacerraf
 Rafael Bielsa
 Maria Cavaco Silva
 Artur Chilingarov
 Jack Dutton 
 Carlos Escudé
 Bob Fulton, John Keenan and Robert Somerville
 Clark Hewett Galloway
 Stanisław Gebhardt
 Thomas Kerstiens
 Antonio López-Istúriz White
 Mike Medavoy
 Adam Michnik
 Alois Mock
 Óscar Osorio
 Christopher Reeve
 Ada Rogato
 Stuart Van Dyke 
 Maxime Verhagen
 Max Westenhöfer
 Héctor Valdez Albizu

Grand Crosses
 Jan Peter Balkenende
 Maria Cavaco Silva
 Tim Fischer
 Piet de Jong
 Roberto Kozak (1992)
 Mohammed VI of Morocco
 Sunao Sonoda
 Tunku Naquiyuddin
 Jan Pronk
 Simon Wiesenthal
 Xavier Barcons (2020)
 Queen Silvia of Sweden
 Prince Daniel, Duke of Västergötland
 Tunku Abdullah (1995)

References

Sources
 Robert Werlich: Orders and Decorations of all Nations – Ancient and Modern – Civil and Military. Washington 1990.

Orders, decorations, and medals of Chile
1956 establishments in Chile
Awards established in 1956